Events from the year 1879 in France.

Incumbents
President: Patrice de MacMahon, Duke of Magenta (until 30 January) Jules Grévy (starting 30 January)
President of the Council of Ministers: 
 until 4 February: Jules Armand Dufaure 
 4 February-28 December: William Waddington.
 starting 28 December: Charles de Freycinet

Events
 April – Postman Ferdinand Cheval begins to build his Palais Idéal at Hauterives.
 1 June – Napoléon Eugène, Prince Imperial (Napoléon IV), great-nephew of Napoléon Bonaparte, Bonapartist Pretender to the throne, dies in Africa during the Anglo-Zulu War.
 17 July – Freycinet Plan enacted to extend rail and other transportation systems.
 "La Marseillaise" is restored as the French national anthem.

Births
 22 January – Francis Picabia, painter and poet (died 1953)
 4 February – Jacques Copeau, journalist, actor, playwright, director, teacher  (died 1949)
 23 March – René Jeannel, entomologist (died 1965)
 20 April – Paul Poiret, fashion designer (died 1944)
 5 June – René Pottier, cyclist, winner of 1906 Tour de France (died 1907)
 9 June – Joseph Avenol, 2nd Secretary General of the League of Nations
 1 July – Léon Jouhaux, trade union leader who received the Nobel Peace Prize in 1951 (died 1954)
 13 July – Eugène Freyssinet, structural and civil engineer (died 1962)
 11 September – Louis Coatalen, automobile engineer and racing driver (died 1962 in the United Kingdom)
 23 September – Charles Camoin, painter (died 1965)
 21 October – Joseph Canteloube, composer (died 1957)
 17 December – Jean-Marie Charles Abrial, Admiral and Minister (died 1962)
 31 December – Joseph Darnand, Bishop (died 1962)

Deaths
 10 February – Honoré Daumier, printmaker, caricaturist, painter and sculptor (born 1808)
 25 February – Jean-Baptiste Glaire, Roman Catholic priest and Hebrew and Biblical scholar (born 1798)
 2 March – Jules Bastide, publicist (born 1800)
 30 March – Thomas Couture, painter and teacher (born 1815)
 16 April - Bernadette Soubirous, nun and visionary of Lourdes apparitions (born 1844)
 20 May – Pierre-Jules Mêne, sculptor (born 1810)
 29 May – Pierre Adolphe Piorry, physician (born 1794)
 1 June – Napoléon Eugène, Prince Imperial, only child of Emperor Napoleon III of France and his Empress consort Eugénie de Montijo (born 1856)
 26 August – Charles Marie Edouard Chassaignac, physician (born 1805)
 6 September – Amédée de Noé, caricaturist and lithographer (born 1818)
 17 September – Eugène Viollet-le-Duc, architect and theorist (born 1814)
 12 November – Jean-Charles Chenu, physician and naturalist (born 1808)
 18 November
 Michel Chevalier, engineer, statesman and economist (born 1806)
 André Giroux, photographer and painter (born 1801)
 19 November – Jean-Joseph Gaume, Roman Catholic theologian and author (born 1802)
 29 December – Jean Étienne Bercé, entomologist (born 1803)

References

1870s in France